"Long Live Love" is a song recorded by American singer LeAnn Rimes for her sixteenth studio album, Remnants (2016). Rimes co-wrote and co-produced the track with Darrell Brown and Mark Batson, with additional production from Niko Bolas. The song was released to digital retailers on December 2, 2016 through RCA Records and Sony Music UK as the album's third single. The song serves as the record's official lead single in North America and impacted American radio in January 2017.

"Long Live Love" has become Rimes' second number one hit on the Billboard Dance Club Songs chart.

Release and promotion
"Long Live Love" was released to digital retailers worldwide on December 2, 2016 through RCA Records and Sony Music UK. The following week, the North American release date of Remnants was announced by Billboard. While previously-released UK singles "The Story" and "How to Kiss a Boy" are available in the United States, "Long Live Love" serves as the official lead single in that market. It was serviced to American hot adult contemporary radio on January 23, 2017, marking Rimes's first radio-promoted single in four years since "Gasoline and Matches" in 2013.

Rimes embarked upon the Long Live Love Club Tour in January 2017 in Los Angeles, California and later took the tour to the United Kingdom. Rimes performed the song live on The Today Show on February 3, 2017. Following the song's #1 success on the Dance Club Songs chart, RCA and Sony commissioned a set of official remixes to further promote the single, which were released as an extended play on February 10, 2017.

Critical reception
Jason Scott of AXS wrote that "Long Live Love" was "among the singer's best recordings," and attributed the song's lyrical success to Rimes's life experience. Matt Bjorke of country music blog Roughstock called the song a "great tempo-filled track" and noted its suitability for adult contemporary radio.

Commercial performance
"Long Live Love" debuted at number 37 on the Billboard Dance Club Songs chart dated January 7, 2017. It reached the top spot on the chart dated March 4, 2017; with this peak, it became Rimes's second single to reach number one on the chart after "What I Cannot Change" in 2009.

Track listing

Charts

Release history

References

2016 songs
2016 singles
LeAnn Rimes songs
RCA Records singles
Sony Music singles
Songs written by LeAnn Rimes
Songs written by Darrell Brown (musician)
Songs written by Mark Batson
Song recordings produced by Mark Batson
Song recordings produced by Niko Bolas